Charles Collier Johnston, Baron Johnston of Rockport, TD (4 March 1915 – 30 April 2002) was a British Conservative politician and businessman.
    
The son of Charles Moore Johnston and Muriel Florence Mellon was educated at Rockport School in County Down and in Tonbridge School in Kent. From 1948 to 1976 Johnston was managing director and 1951 to 1977 Chairman of Standex International Ltd. In 1980, he was official observer of the elections in Zimbabwe.

He was commissioned into the Royal Artillery, reaching the rank of Captain. Having been knighted in 1973, he was created a life peer as Baron Johnston of Rockport, of Caversham in the Royal County of Berkshire on 30 March 1987.

Johnston had married twice, Audrey Boyes in 1939 and Yvonne Shearman in 1981. He had two sons from his first wife.

References

 

1915 births
2002 deaths
Royal Artillery officers
Knights Bachelor
Johnston of Rockport
People educated at Rockport School
20th-century British businesspeople
20th-century British Army personnel
Life peers created by Elizabeth II